Henri M. J. de Deken (3 August 1907 in Schoten – 12 February 1960) was a Belgian association football player in defender role. In career he played mostly for Royal Antwerp F.C. For Belgium national football team he was in roster for 1930 FIFA World Cup, played one match with Paraguay, losses 0–1. He was also part of Belgium's team at the 1928 Summer Olympics, but he did not play in any matches.

References

External links
 
 
 

1907 births
1960 deaths
Belgian footballers
Belgium international footballers
Association football defenders
Royal Antwerp F.C. players
Olympic footballers of Belgium
Footballers at the 1928 Summer Olympics
1930 FIFA World Cup players
People from Schoten
Footballers from Antwerp Province